is a Japanese digital artist, illustrator and photograph who is known for painting elaborately detailed and spectacularly colored images of space and utopian worlds.

Biography
Kagaya Yutaka born in Saitama, north of Tokyo(Japan). He studied and graduated from the Tokyo Designer Gakuin College. He then became an illustrator for the astronomy magazine Hoshi Navi.

The International Astronomical Union named the asteroid number 11949 after Kagaya Yutaka in 2003.

Style
His images often include elements with a luminous quality. Some of his favorite subjects are astronomy and visions of utopian worlds.

His most famous works focus on three main topics: Celestial Exploring, Galactic Railroad and Starry Tales. Kagaya really likes the night sky with stars and he often uses the blue color in his work.

Filmography
 Fantasy Railroad in the Stars (銀河鉄道の夜) with Kenji Miyazawa (DVD, 2007). The DVD features the story of a boy dreaming of travelling by train through the Milky Way, and the story is narrated by the voice actress Kuwashima Houko.

Bibliography
 The Encyclopedia of the Four Seasons

References

External sources
Official website

Digital artists
1968 births
Living people